The 2018 FIBA U20 Women's European Championship was the 17th edition of the Women's U-20 European basketball championship. 16 teams participated in the competition, which was played in Sopron, Hungary, from 7 to 15 July 2018.

Venues

Participating teams

  (3rd place, 2017 FIBA U20 Women's European Championship Division B)

  (Winners, 2017 FIBA U20 Women's European Championship Division B)
 

  (Runners-up, 2017 FIBA U20 Women's European Championship Division B)

Preliminary round
In this round, the 16 teams are allocated in four groups of four teams each. All teams advance to the playoff round of 16.

Group A

Group B

Group C

Group D

Knockout stage

Championship bracket

5th–8th place bracket

9th–16th place bracket

13th–16th place bracket

Final

Final standings

Awards

All-Tournament Team
  Iris Junio (MVP)
  Ivana Racca 
  Ivana Katanic
  Laura Westerik 
  Satou Sabally

References

External links
FIBA official website

2018
Under-20 Championship
2018–19 in Hungarian basketball
International youth basketball competitions hosted by Hungary
International women's basketball competitions hosted by Hungary
Sport in Sopron
July 2018 sports events in Europe
2018 in youth sport